The 2019 Eastern Michigan Eagles football team represented Eastern Michigan University during the 2019 NCAA Division I FBS football season. The Eagles were led by sixth-year head coach Chris Creighton and played their home games at Rynearson Stadium in Ypsilanti, Michigan. They competed as members of the West Division of the Mid-American Conference (MAC).

Preseason

MAC media poll
The MAC released their preseason media poll on July 23, 2019, with the Eagles predicted to finish in fourth place in the West Division.

Schedule
Eastern Michigan's 2019 schedule will begin with four non-conference games, with three away games against Coastal Carolina of the Sun Belt Conference, Kentucky of the Southeastern Conference (SEC), and Illinois of the Big Ten Conference, and then a home game against Central Connecticut of the Northeast Conference. In Mid-American Conference play, the Eagles will play home games against Ball State, Western Michigan, Buffalo, and Kent State, and road games against Central Michigan, Toledo, Akron, and Northern Illinois. They will not play East Division members Miami, Ohio, or Bowling Green as part of the regular season.

Game summaries

at Coastal Carolina

at Kentucky

at Illinois

Central Connecticut

at Central Michigan

Ball State

Western Michigan

at Toledo

Buffalo

at Akron

at Northern Illinois

Kent State

vs. Pittsburgh (Quick Lane Bowl)

References

Eastern Michigan
Eastern Michigan Eagles football seasons
Eastern Michigan Eagles football